Tipu Sultan was the ruler of the Kingdom of Mysore in southern India.

Tipu Sultan may also refer to:

People 
 Tipu Sultan (politician) (born 1967), Bangladeshi politician
 Tipu Sultan (journalist) (born c. 1973), Bangladeshi freelance investigative journalist
 Tipu Sultan (cricketer) (born 1998), Bangladeshi cricketer
 Khan Tipu Sultan (1950–2017), Bangladeshi politician

Arts and entertainment 

 Tipu Sultan - Villain or Hero, 1993 Indian non-fiction book about the sultan by Sita Ram Goel
 Tipu Sultan: The Tiger Lord, Pakistani television series about the sultan
 The Dreams of Tipu Sultan, Indian play about the sultan by Girish Karnad
 The Sword of Tipu Sultan, Indian television series about the sultan

Other uses 
Tipu Sultan's Mausoleum or Gumbaz, Srirangapatna, mausoleum of Tippu Sultan in Seringapatam
Tipu Sultan's Summer Palace, Bangalore, India
Tipu Sultan Mosque, Kolkata, India
Tipu Sultan Unani Medical College, Gulbarga, Karnataka, India
Tipu Sultan Beach now Saddam Beach, Kerala, India

See also 
Tipu (disambiguation)
Siege of Seringapatam (1799), last stand of Tipu Sultan against the British